Frederick Gunton (1813–1888) was an English organist.

Life

Born in Norwich, he was the son of Thomas and Mary Gunton. He studied organ under Alfred Pettit at St Peter Mancroft in Norwich.

He died in Chester in 1888 and is buried in Upton churchyard.

Career
He was:
Organist of Southwell Minster 1835–41
Organist of Chester Cathedral 1841–71

References

Cathedral organists
1813 births
1888 deaths
Musicians from Norwich
19th-century classical musicians
19th-century organists